Daniel Dagallier (born 11 June 1926) is a French former fencer. He was born in Trévoux. He won a bronze medal in the team épée event at the 1956 Summer Olympics.

References

External links
 

1926 births
Living people
People from Trévoux
French male épée fencers
Olympic fencers of France
Fencers at the 1952 Summer Olympics
Fencers at the 1956 Summer Olympics
Olympic bronze medalists for France
Olympic medalists in fencing
Medalists at the 1956 Summer Olympics
Sportspeople from Ain
20th-century French people